Jalan Bukit Merah may refer to:
Jalan Bukit Merah, Malaysia, a major road in Perak
Jalan Bukit Merah, Singapore, a major arterial road in Bukit Merah